{{DISPLAYTITLE:Samarium (153Sm) lexidronam}}

Samarium (153Sm) lexidronam (chemical name Samarium-153-ethylene diamine tetramethylene phosphonate, abbreviated  Samarium-153 EDTMP, trade name Quadramet) is a chelated complex of a radioisotope of the element samarium with EDTMP. It is used to treat pain when cancer has spread to the bone.

It is injected into a vein and distributed throughout the body, where it is preferentially absorbed in areas where cancer has invaded the bone. The radioisotope 153Sm, with a half-life of 46.3 hours, decays by emitting beta particles (electrons), which kill the nearby cells. Pain begins to improve in the first week for most people and the effects can last several months. It is commonly used in lung cancer, prostate cancer, breast cancer, and osteosarcoma.

Side effects
Side effects include the following:
Black, tarry stools
Blood in urine/stool
Cough, hoarseness
Fever/chills
Lower back/side pain
Painful or difficult urination
Pinpoint red spots on skin
Irregular heartbeat
Nausea, vomiting

Supply and administration
Samarium lexidronam is supplied as a frozen solution for intravenous use with an activity of 50±5 mCi/mL and a maximum beta energy of 0.808 MeV. Due to the short half-life of the radioisotope, the drug expires 56 hours after the noted calibration time.

References 

Radiopharmaceuticals
Samarium compounds
Phosphonates
Coordination complexes
Tertiary amines